AEW Dark, or simply Dark, is an American professional wrestling streaming television program produced by the American promotion All Elite Wrestling (AEW). New episodes are uploaded every Tuesday night at 7 p.m. Eastern Time on AEW's YouTube channel, with occasional additional episodes uploaded on other nights. The program features matches taped either before or after the preceding episode of Rampage (if it was live), a pay-per-view, or at Soundstage 21 in Universal Studios Florida, which serves as the main location for the tapings of Darks weekly episodes. Previously, it was taped before and after the preceding episode of AEW's flagship program, Dynamite, and had featured segments highlighting the previous week's Dynamite and interviews with AEW personalities. The show was previously hosted by Tony Schiavone and Dasha Gonzalez in a studio called the "AEW Control Center".

History

On October 2, 2019, All Elite Wrestling's (AEW) flagship program, Dynamite, premiered on TNT. During the event, there were four dark matches, two before and two after the live broadcast. During the media scrum following this event, AEW President and Chief Executive Officer Tony Khan stated that the dark matches would become available to view on video in some form. On October 5, then-AEW Executive Vice President and wrestler Cody Rhodes announced a sister program to Dynamite called AEW Dark, which would be the home of AEW's dark matches. On October 8, the program began airing on Tuesdays at 8pm Eastern Time (ET) on AEW's YouTube channel. During the week of a pay-per-view (PPV), however, Dark would air on Friday as the go-home show; this continued until May 2021 for that year's Double or Nothing PPV. Unlike the dark matches of other wrestling promotions, which generally do not affect storylines, these matches on Dark are part of AEW's storylines and count towards the wrestlers' match statistics.

During the November 5 episode, Tony Schiavone announced AEW Spanish commentator Dasha Gonzalez would be his co-host going forward. Schiavone and Gonzalez hosted segments on Dark from the "AEW Control Center," highlighting matches and storylines within AEW. On December 31, AEW aired a special episode called AEW Dark – 2019 Year in Review, featuring highlights of the show from the past year.

On February 24, 2021, AEW announced that a new spinoff of Dark would premiere on Monday, March 15 titled Dark: Elevation. This is the promotion's third program, after Dynamite and Dark, and airs on Monday nights at 7pm ET, also on AEW's YouTube channel. With the premiere of Rampage in August 2021, which also airs on TNT, Khan said that Dynamite and Rampage would be AEW's core properties, while their YouTube shows, Dark and Elevation, would be their peripheral properties, essentially their developmental shows. Rampage airs in the 10pm ET slot on Fridays and replaced Dark as the go-home show for pay-per-views.

On August 27, 2021, it was revealed that Dark would begin being taped at its own set within Universal Studios in Orlando, Florida at Soundstage 21—the same studio which previously hosted weekly episodes of TNA Impact!—while Elevation would continue to be taped in conjunction with Dynamite. The first set of tapings for Dark at Universal Studios began on September 11, 2021. AEW does Darks tapings about once a month, recording four shows per taping with each show lasting about 90 minutes. During the weeks that either TNT program (Rampage or Battle of the Belts) airs live, AEW tapes Dark in conjunction with the that program.  AEW has also taped Dark in conjunction with Elevation, notably in December 2021.

Roster

The wrestlers featured on All Elite Wrestling take part in scripted feuds and storylines. Wrestlers are portrayed as heroes, villains, or less distinguishable characters in scripted events that build tension and culminate in a wrestling match or series of matches. AEW Dark features both AEW contracted wrestlers and various independent wrestlers.

Commentators

Ring announcers

References

External links

Dark
2019 American television series debuts
2019 web series debuts
2010s YouTube series
2020s YouTube series
American professional wrestling television series
American non-fiction web series
YouTube original programming
English-language television shows